This is a list of bridges and tunnels on the National Register of Historic Places in the U.S. state of South Dakota.

References

 
South Dakota
Bridges
Bridges